Job Graça is an Angolan economist, teacher and politician. He studied economics at the University of Essex in the United Kingdom. He has held various ministerial positions within the Angolan government, passing through Deputy Minister positions in the Ministries of Planning, Economy, Finance, and Transport. He served as Minister of Planning and Territory Development from 2012 to 2013.

References

Living people
21st-century Angolan politicians
Alumni of the University of Essex
Government ministers of Angola
Year of birth missing (living people)

pt:Job Graça